Jakob Kalju (29 March 1903 Järvesuu Parish (now Setomaa Parish), Petserimaa – 20 April 1942 Sevurallag, Sverdlovsk Oblast) was an Estonian politician. He was a member of Estonian National Assembly.

References

1903 births
1942 deaths
People from Setomaa Parish
People from Pskovsky Uyezd
Patriotic League (Estonia) politicians
Members of the Estonian National Assembly
Estonian people who died in Soviet detention
People who died in the Gulag